Psathyropus is a genus of harvestmen in the family Sclerosomatidae from Asia.

Species
 Psathyropus aurolucens (Roewer, 1954)
 Psathyropus bengalensis (Roewer, 1954)
 Psathyropus bilineata (Roewer, 1954)
 Psathyropus bimaculata (Roewer, 1954)
 Psathyropus biseriata (Roewer, 1912)
 Psathyropus cingulata (Roewer, 1954)
 Psathyropus conspicua (Roewer, 1954)
 Psathyropus cuprilucida (Roewer, 1954)
 Psathyropus conjugata (Roewer, 1954)
 Psathyropus damila Silhavý, 1976
 Psathyropus distincta (Sato & Suzuki, 1938)
 Psathyropus formosa (Roewer, 1911)
 Psathyropus granulata (Roewer, 1954)
 Psathyropus granulosa Suzuki, 1977
 Psathyropus guttata (Roewer, 1954)
 Psathyropus hainanensis (Wang, 1941)
 Psathyropus hsuehshanensis Suzuki, 1977
 Psathyropus hirta (Roewer, 1915)
 Psathyropus koyamai (S. Suzuki, 1979)
 Psathyropus luteomaculata (S. Suzuki, 1970)
 Psathyropus mandalayia (Roewer, 1954)
 Psathyropus minax (Thorell, 1889)
 Psathyropus mysoreana (Roewer, 1954)
 Psathyropus nigra (Roewer, 1912)
 Psathyropus octomaculata (Roewer, 1954)
 Psathyropus perakana (Roewer, 1954)
 Psathyropus pustulata (Roewer, 1910)
 Psathyropus roeweri (Suzuki, 1974)
 Psathyropus rufa (Roewer, 1954)
 Psathyropus rufoscuta (S. Suzuki, 1982)
 Psathyropus satarensis (Roewer, 1954)
 Psathyropus silvestri (Roewer, 1927)
 Psathyropus sinensis (Schenkel, 1953)
 Psathyropus sordidata (Thorell, 1889)
 Psathyropus sulcata (Roewer, 1954)
 Psathyropus tenuipes L. Koch, 1878
 Psathyropus tenuis (Roewer, 1954)
 Psathyropus tongkingensis (Roewer, 1954)
 Psathyropus usuriensis (Redikorzev, 1936)
 Psathyropus versicolor (Suzuki, 1964)

References

Harvestmen
Harvestman genera